A by-election was held for the New South Wales Legislative Assembly electorate of Surry Hills on 21 July 1906 because of the resignation of John Norton. Norton blamed William Holman for an article in The Worker commenting on Norton's unnatural silence over the land scandals involving Paddy Crick and William Willis. Norton made a personal attack on Holman in parliament, challenging him to resign and both would contest Holman's seat of Cootamundra.

Dates

Result

John Norton challenged William Holman to resign and both would contest Holman's seat of Cootamundra.

Aftermath
The Cootamundra by-election was held the following week, however Norton withdrew from the contest. H. V. Evatt argues that the most likely explanation for Norton's attack was to remove Labour's best debater at a critical time. Norton returned to parliament at the 1907 election for Darling Harbour.

See also
Electoral results for the district of Surry Hills
List of New South Wales state by-elections

Notes

References

1906 elections in Australia
New South Wales state by-elections
1900s in New South Wales